Dysschema marginalis is a moth of the family Erebidae first described by Francis Walker in 1855. It is found in Venezuela, Ecuador and Colombia.

References

Moths described in 1855
Dysschema